Microsoft Office 3.0 was a release of Microsoft Office. It was the second major release for the Microsoft Windows operating system and the third on the Macintosh, preceding Microsoft Office 4.0. Omitting version 2 entirely on Windows, Microsoft released Office 3.0 on August 30, 1992. Previously, these components were distributed separately for Windows, and it was with Microsoft Office that they were combined as a full office suite.

Its main components included Word 2.0c, Excel 4.0a, PowerPoint 3.0, and Mail, a network messaging client. Versions for Macintosh were also updated to Word 5.1, which didn't exist for Windows.

References

1992 software
Office 3.0